Polypathomyia is a genus of flies in the family Pseudopomyzidae.

Distribution
Japan.

Species
Polypathomyia stackelbergi Krivosheina, 1979

References

Pseudopomyzidae
Brachycera genera
Diptera of Asia